Rear Admiral Jack Raymond Steer,  is a retired Royal New Zealand Navy officer, who served as Chief of Navy from 2012 to 2015.

Career
Born in Christchurch, Steer joined the Navy in 1973.

He served as Chief of Staff at Joint Forces Headquarters from January 2003 to April 2004, when he was promoted to commodore and appointed as Maritime Component Commander. He was appointed Deputy Chief of Navy In January 2006 before taking up the position of Commander Joint Forces New Zealand in May 2006, with promotion to rear admiral. In February 2008, he was appointed Vice Chief of Defence Force until 2012 when he was appointed Chief of Navy.

Steer was appointed a 1996 Queen's Birthday Honours in the 1996 Birthday Honours.

References

External links

|-

|-

Living people
Officers of the New Zealand Order of Merit
Royal New Zealand Navy admirals
Year of birth missing (living people)